Dominic Raacke (born 11 December 1958) is a German actor and screenwriter. He is best known for his performance as Till Ritter in Tatort. He appeared in more than seventy films since 1981.

Selected filmography

References

External links 

1958 births
Living people
German male film actors
German male television actors
20th-century German male actors
21st-century German male actors
German screenwriters
German male screenwriters
People from Hanau
Film people from Hesse